William James "Bill, Billy" Gibson (April 22, 1927 – August 29, 2006) was a Canadian ice hockey player.

He lived in Lethbridge, Alberta.

Gibson was a member of the Edmonton Mercurys that won a gold medal at the 1952 Winter Olympics in Oslo, Norway. During the tournament, he scored 15 goals and 7 assists in 8 games, making him the top scorer.

External links
bio

1927 births
2006 deaths
Canadian ice hockey centres
Sportspeople from Lethbridge
Ice hockey players at the 1952 Winter Olympics
Medalists at the 1952 Winter Olympics
Olympic gold medalists for Canada
Olympic ice hockey players of Canada
Olympic medalists in ice hockey
Ice hockey people from Alberta